Arthur G. Robertson (born 1879, date of death unknown) was a British water polo player.  Robertson was a member of the Osborne Swimming Club of Manchester, which fielded the winning team.  The International Olympic Committee credits him with a gold medal in water polo at the 1900 Summer Olympics, but this is incorrect as sources contemporary to the Games do not mention him as being part of the squad.

References

Buchanan, Ian  British Olympians. Guinness Publishing (1991) 

1879 births
Year of death missing
British male water polo players
Place of birth missing